The Rock most often refers to:
 Dwayne Johnson (born 1972), American actor, businessman, retired professional wrestler
 The Rock (film), 1996 film starring Sean Connery and Nicolas Cage, directed by Michael Bay

The Rock or The Rocks may also refer to:

Places

Australia
 The Rocks, New South Wales, a Sydney suburb
 The Rock, New South Wales, a town

Canada
 Newfoundland (island)
 The Rocks or Hopewell Rocks, New Brunswick, a coastal formation in Canada

United States
 The Rock (Michigan State University), a boulder on the campus of Michigan State University
 The Rock (Northwestern University), a landmark at Northwestern University in Evanston, Illinois
 The Rock, Georgia, an unincorporated community
 The Rock, or Alcatraz Island, small island in San Francisco Bay, California, United States
 The Rock, Carolina Panthers training facility in Rock Hill, South Carolina
 The Rocks, or McKees Rocks, Pennsylvania, a borough
 The Rocks (Jefferson County, West Virginia), a historic place in Jefferson County, West Virginia
 Rocks Estate, also simply The Rocks, National Historic Place, Bethlehem, New Hampshire

Elsewhere
 Ayers Kaserne, a closed U.S. Army Cold War military post in Kirch-Göns, Germany
 Bermuda, often referred to by islanders as The Rock.
 Gibraltar, often referred to as The Rock, from The Rock of Gibraltar
 Corregidor, an island in the Philippines
 Monaco-Ville, the old town of Monaco and one of its administrative divisions, known locally as Le Rocher (The Rock)
 Niue, an island in the South Pacific, near Tonga, commonly referred to as "The Rock (of Polynesia)"

People
 Ole Anderson (born 1942), American referee, promoter and retired wrestler
 Jesus Christ (–CE 28), the central figure of Christianity, Jewish preacher and religious leader
 Peter Hudson (darts player) (born 1984), English darts player
 Don Muraco (born 1949), American retired wrestler
 Saint Peter (died between CE 64 and 68) Apostle of Jesus and 1st pope from 30 CE till 64-68 CE
 Pedro Rizzo (born 1974), Brazilian martial artist 
 Michael Rock (swimmer), (born 1987), British swimmer
 Asi Taulava (born 1973), Filipino-Tongan basketball player
 Larry Zeidel (1928–2014), Canadian ice hockey player
 Ronny Rockel (born 1972), German bodybuilder

Arts, entertainment, and media

Music

Albums
 The Rock (The Frankie Miller Band album), 1975
 The Rock (John Entwistle album), 1996
 The Rock (SBB album), 2007
 The Rock (Tracy Lawrence album), 2009

Songs
 "The Rock", by Atomic Rooster from In Hearing of Atomic Rooster
 "The Rock", by Delakota from One Love
 "The Rock", an instrumental by the Who from Quadrophenia

Other uses in music
 The Rock (Rachmaninoff), an orchestral composition
 The Rocks (band), former UK indie rock band
 The Rock, Indonesian rock band formed by Ahmad Dhani

Other uses in arts, entertainment, and media
 The Rock (play), a play by T. S. Eliot
 The Rock (radio station), a New Zealand rock music radio network
 "The Rock", episode of the sitcom The King of Queens

Buildings

Athletic facilities
 The Rock (stadium), a football ground in Rhosymedre, Wales and home to Cefn Druids A.F.C.
 Kidd Brewer Stadium, or "The Rock", at Appalachian State University
 Knute Rockne Memorial athletic facility, or "The Rock', on the University of Notre Dame
 Memorial Stadium (Indiana), or "The Rock", on the Indiana University campus
 Prudential Center, or "The Rock", in Newark, N.J.

Other buildings
 The Rock (building), a tower in Amsterdam
"The Rock", Alcatraz Federal Penitentiary on island in San Francisco Bay
"The Rock", or Rock N Roll McDonald's in Chicago
 "The Rock", Rockefeller Center in New York City
 The Rocks, Albany, residence in Albany, Western Australia

Sports
 The Rock (rugby team) or Atlantic Rock, a rugby union team based in St. John's, Newfoundland & Labrador, Canada
 "The Rock," nickname of the athletic teams of Slippery Rock University
 The Rocks or Glasgow Rocks, a British basketball team
 Rockingham Speedway, a former NASCAR race track affectionately known as "The Rock"
 Toronto Rock, a Canadian indoor lacrosse team

Other uses
 The Rock or Chicago, Rock Island and Pacific Railroad, a former Class I railroad in the United States
 The Rocks, Inc., U.S. military officers' organization
 The Rock (diamond), largest white diamond ever auctioned as of 2022

See also
 
 Rock (disambiguation)